N.V. Elmar is the sole provider of electricity on the island of Aruba.

N.V. Elmar is an abbreviation for the full company name in Dutch: "Naamloze Vennootschap Electriciteit-Maatschappij Aruba".

The Naamloze Vennootschap, abbreviated as N.V. is the traditional Limited Liability Company with its capital divided into shares and may be compared with the Spanish S.A. and the U.S. Corporation.

External links

N.V. Elmar Official Website

Electric power companies of Aruba